Thomas Campbell Wasson (February 8, 1896 – 23 May 1948) was an American diplomat who was assassinated while serving as the Consul General for the United States in Jerusalem. He was also a member of the United Nations Truce Commission.

Biography 
Wasson was born February 8, 1896, in Great Falls, Montana, and raised in Newark, New Jersey. From 1926 to 1929, he served as the United States Vice Consul in Melbourne, Australia. In 1932, he was Vice Consul in Puerto Cortes, Honduras, and in 1938, became the Consul in Lagos, Nigeria. In April 1948, Wasson was appointed as the Consul General for the US in Jerusalem.

On 19 May 1948, The Scotsman quoted a report by Wasson saying the British Consul had a "narrow escape" when the consulate came under gunfire. On 22 May, it was reported that Wasson had attempted to stop the Arab Legion shelling of the Hadassah Hospital and Hebrew University on Mount Scopus: "The American Consul is reported to have contacted the Legion requesting it to stop firing on Jewish positions in and around the buildings. The Legion's commander replied that the buildings were being used by Jewish forces to mortar and machine-gun the Arab-occupied Sheikh Jarrah quarter and handed the Consul surrender terms to convey to the Jews. The commander asked that all fighting Jews in the hospital and university surrender as prisoners of war and that all doctors, nurses, professors, and scientists be handed over to the Red Cross."

Later the same day, just after 2.00pm, Wasson was shot while returning to the US Consulate from a meeting of the UN Truce Commission at the French Consulate in Jerusalem. While crossing Wauchope Street (now Abraham Lincoln/Hess) to enter the alley leading to the consulate, he was shot by a .30 caliber rifle. The bullet entered his chest via his right upper arm and left level to his second costal cartilage. Wasson died the following day.

Wasson's funeral was described by the American journalist Arthur Derounian (John Roy Carlson) in his book Cairo to Damascus.

Wasson was replaced by Vice-Consul William Burdette. Wasson's body was returned to the United States and interred at Washington National Cathedral.

Dispute about shooter
The shooter was never identified. In the aftermath of the killing, there were contradictory reports on whether the gun was fired by an Arab or Jew. The New York Times reported on 23 May that Wasson "on his death bed stated that Arabs had shot him," but retracted the statement two weeks later. On 25 May, The Scotsman newspaper quoted an Israeli government statement that Wasson "was killed by Arab bullets." According to The New York Post on 8 June, sources in Amman claimed Wasson was shot by the Israelis, but that this was contradicted by Wasson's alleged last words in hospital. The Post report claimed that an American government document stated that his dying words, to the Jewish nurses at his bedside, were that he had been shot by Arabs.

In the first edition of her book Our Jerusalem, a history of the American Colony in Jerusalem, Bertha Spafford Vester quotes her diary entry for 23 May 1948: "Our American Consul, Mr. Robert [sic] Wasson was shot by Jews on Friday and died today."

In his account, published in 1960, the Military Governor of Jerusalem, Dov Joseph, wrote that Wasson "was shot on 22 May by an Arab sniper."

Diplomatic reports
On April 15, 1948, in a report concerning the Hadassah Hospital Convoy Massacre, Wasson wrote, "American correspondent eye witnessed removal from trucks large quantities arms and ammunition and speculated whether for escort or other purpose."

On April 17, 1948, he wrote: " . . . queried as to whether convoy included armoured cars, Haganah guards, arms and ammunition in addition to doctors, nurses and patients, Kohn [of the Jewish Agency] replied in affirmative saying it was necessary to protect convoy."

On May 18, 1948, Wasson wrote: "Looting in the captured Arab areas has now been so widespread and has been regarded with such indifference by the authorities that it is difficult not to think it is officially tolerated."

References

Source

Explanatory note

1896 births
1948 deaths
American people murdered abroad
1948 murders in Israel
Assassinated American diplomats
1948 in Israel
People murdered in Israel
War-related deaths
People of the 1948 Arab–Israeli War
Terrorism deaths in Jerusalem
Ambassadors of the United States to Nigeria
Ambassadors of the United States to Honduras
Ambassadors of the United States to Australia
Ambassadors of the United States to Israel
People from Great Falls, Montana
People from Newark, New Jersey
1940s in Jerusalem
Burials at Washington National Cathedral